Florian Nüßle (born 18 December 2001)  is an Austrian snooker player from Graz. In 2017, aged 16, he became his country's youngest national snooker champion.

Career

National tournaments 
Florian Nüßle became interested in snooker as a child and played pool with a standing aid when he was five years old. He also played football in his youth for five years for SK Sturm Graz and golf, but ultimately opted for snooker. After obtaining his secondary school certificate he went to the UK with the aim of becoming a professional player.

He first participated in the Austrian national youth championships in 2007, and won his first national title in the under16 age group at the age of 13, defending his title in the following two years. In 2015 he won the under21 title and defended it in the years that followed. At 16, he became the youngest player to win the national championship when he won the Austrian National Championship. He also became ranked as Austrian number one that season. In 2018 he played  in the final, winning 5–2.

International tournaments 
After his first national youth title, he played in the EBSA European Under-21 Snooker Championships and IBSF World Under-21 Snooker Championship. At the 2017 event, he reached the quarter-finals of the under-21 event. He also entered the IBSF World Snooker Championship that year, reaching the semi-finals losing to eventual champion Pankaj Advani 4–7. From 2017, he competed in the annual pro-am Paul Hunter Classic (PHC), an amateur tournament from the World Snooker Tour. He would defeat professional player Elliot Slessor during the 2018 event.

Performance and rankings timeline

Career finals

Amateur finals: 8 (5 titles)

References 

2001 births
Austrian snooker players
Living people
Sportspeople from Graz
21st-century Austrian people